Liudolf of Vermandois (died before 9 November 986), son of Adalbert I, Count of Vermandois, and Gerberge of Lorraine.

Luidolf was appointed Bishop of Noyon in 979 after the death of his predecessor Hadulphe, as reported by Flodoard. Lothair, King of West Francia, dedicated the monastery of Saint-Eloy de Noyon in Liudolf's memory.

Notes

Sources

Date of birth unknown
986 deaths